InstallCore was an installation and content distribution platform created by ironSource, including a software development kit (SDK) for Windows and Mac OS X. The program allowed those using it for distribution to include monetization by advertisements, charging for installation, etc., and took pains to make its installations invisible to the user and to anti-virus software.

The platform, and programs using it, have been rated potentially unwanted programs (PUP) or potentially unwanted applications (PUA) by anti-malware product vendors since 2014, and by Windows Defender Antivirus since 2015.

The platform was primarily designed for efficient web based deployment of various type of application software.  installCore was managing 100 million installations every month, offering services for paid, unpaid and free software (using the SDK version). installCore was a product of ironSource, which is headquartered in Tel Aviv with offices in San Francisco, California in the United States and Beijing, China.

InstallCore was discontinued as part of a company flotation in late 2020.

History
The InstallCore team introduced the first version of the SDK at the beginning of 2011,  the SDK was a fork of the FoxTab installer and had only basic Installation features. 

The first version only include three files - system.js, application.js and packages.js which support over the web software packages delivery and basic system modifications.
The second version introduced debug capabilities, support for the different windows versions and web forms support; it also enabled integration of JQuery and CSS 2.1 for better UI design

Features 
InstallCore development platform provides a software development kit (SDK) based on JavaScript and HTML/HTML 5.0. Installation project can be compiled into a windows executable file and used for the software installation and distribution. The platform supports the following features:
Small stub (347 KB)
JavaScript based
Multilingual (Chinese and RTL languages are supported from version 3.1)
LZMA compression
Integrated download accelerator for remote files
Content delivery network (CDN), hosting files for download
Reporting and business intelligence module

JavaScript and HTML based user interface
Version 2.1 introduced a fully customizable design interface based on HTML, CSS and a JavaScript SDK.

<head>
	<meta http-equiv="Content-Type" content="text/html;charset=utf-8" />
	<!-- sdk - include here the minimum required scripts -->
	<script type="text/javascript" src="sdk/debug.js"></script>
	<script type="text/javascript" src="sdk/form.js"></script>
</head>
<body>
	<div id="irsoForm" irsoTransition="fade" irsoWidth="620" irsoHeight="380" 
	irsoBorderStyle="bsNone" irsoStayOnTop="true">
	
	<div id="main">
		<div id="topPanel" class="irsoDragHandle">
			<div id="closeIcon" onclick="closeWindow()"></div>
			<div id="TOP_TITLE" class="irsoDragHandle" style="display:none"></div>
			<div id="logo" class="irsoDragHandle">Hello World!</div>
		</div>
	</div>
</body>
Since installCore version 4.10 the SDK integrated 12 fully pre-designed templates and a customization tool to create a WYSIWYG design.

Monetization features
The program has features supporting generation of revenue for users by advertising, charging for program installation, etc.
Full Windows API support, including full file system and registry access, loading and execution of dynamic link libraries and executing files.
Ad server technology, named FlowAutomator, to support optional 3rd party products during installations
Client side profiling algorithms, including data of previous downloads.
Full Html UI support including JQuery, Zepto.js and CSS 4.0
Optional Pay-per-install (PPI) monetization component

Compiler make script
The installCore compiler program HtmlUiMaker uses a make script , such as the following example, in order to compile a JavaScript and HTML skin into executable installation programs.
; Example Make script - Set Parameters
[APP_MAKER]
; App_Maker parameters used to create output EXE file
SKIN="\skin"
; Set installer icon
APP_ICON="\resources\installer.ico"  
RAW_EXE=Setup32.exe
COMPRESS=1
OUT_EXE=\release\%EXE_CODE%Setup_v%VI_FILE_VER%.exe

Criticism and malware classification 
installCore and software packages relying on it have been classified as potentially unwanted program (PUP) or potentially unwanted application (PUA), by anti-malware product vendors and Windows Defender Antivirus from 2014-2015 onwards, with many stating that it installs adware and other additional PUPs. Malwarebytes identified the program as "a family of bundlers that installs more than one application on the user's computer". It has been described as crossing "the line into full-blown malware" and a "nasty Trojan".

Generated installer
The generated installer is a Portable Executable which contains the installation script. The installer can be configured to function as full installer or a bootstrap installer. As the installation script is compiled, it cannot be obtained from the delivered executable without reverse-engineering the binary.

Multilingual support
As of version 3.1 of the official release installCore fully supported both Unicode and RTL but depended on Windows 2000 with SP 4 as minimum requirement to accurately present the UI.

See also 
List of installation software

References

External links 

Developer Site
InstallCore SDK
Historical SDK Documentation 

Adware
Installation software
Programming tools
Software companies of Israel